Pavlak Glacier is a glacier that drains east from the Queen Elizabeth Range into Lowery Glacier close south of Mount Predoehl. Mapped by the United States Geological Survey (USGS) from tellurometer surveys and Navy air photos, 1960–62. Named by Advisory Committee on Antarctic Names (US-ACAN) for Thomas L. Pavlak, United States Antarctic Research Program (USARP) glaciologist at South Pole Station, 1962–63.

Glaciers of the Ross Dependency
Shackleton Coast